Kolos is a rural locality (a khutor) in Teuchezhsky District of the Republic of Adygea, Russia.

Rural localities in Teuchezhsky District